ONE X: 10 Years Anniversary was a Combat sport event produced by ONE Championship that took place on March 26, 2022, at the Singapore Indoor Stadium in Kallang, Singapore.

Background
On 27 October 2021, CEO Chatri Sityodtong broke the news that ONE: X would be postponed to early 2022, owing to a recent surge in the COVID-19 pandemic in Singapore. The event was later rescheduled for March 26, 2022.

A Special-Rules bout between current ONE Flyweight Muay Thai World Champion Rodtang Jitmuangnon and former UFC Flyweight Champion (also 2019 ONE Flyweight World Grand Prix Champion) Demetrious Johnson took place at the co-main event. The contest was set for four, three-minute rounds alternating between Muay Thai and MMA rules. The fight started under Muay Thai rules and switched to MMA for the following rounds.

A ONE Women's Atomweight World Championship bout between current champion Angela Lee and former ONE Women's Atomweight Muay Thai and Kickboxing World Champion (also 2021 ONE Women's Atomweight World Grand Prix Champion) Stamp Fairtex headlined the event.

ONE Bantamweight Muay Thai World Champion Nong-O Gaiyanghadao was scheduled to defend his title against former ONE Bantamweight Kickboxing World Champion Alaverdi Ramazanov. However, Because of the 2022 Russian invasion of Ukraine, Ramazanov was replaced with the Brazilian Felipe Lobo.

John Wayne Parr faced former two-time ONE Lightweight World Champion Eduard Folayang in Wushu vs. Muay Thai legends fight and It's the last fight of Parr in professional competition. 

Shinya Aoki and Yoshihiro Akiyama faced one another at ONE X in a clash of Japanese MMA legends.

Top Filipino strawweights Lito Adiwang and Jeremy Miado faced each other at this event. A rematch between Seo Hee Ham and Denice Zamboanga was also booked for the event. A featherweight fight between Amir Khan and Ryogo Takahashi was added to the ONE: X card.

Reinier de Ridder and Andre Galvao met in a submission grappling match. The American Danielle Kelly made her debut at ONE X in an atomweight submission grappling match against Japanese veteran Mei Yamaguchi.

Nieky Holzken was scheduled to face Islam Murtazaev in a fight between two top lightweight Kickboxing contenders. Shoko Sato was to meet Yusup Saadulaev in a battle of formerly ranked bantamweight contenders. The card also featured Ryuto Sawada and Senzo Ikeda, who meet in a strawweight contest. However, due to the 2022 Russian invasion of Ukraine, all Russian athletes were removed from the card as a result of the Singaporean government banning them from entering the country. As a result, Murtazaev was replaced by Sinsamut Klinmee and Yusup Saadulaev was replaced by Stephen Loman. 

Alyse Anderson was scheduled to fight with Indian striker Asha Roka. However, Anderson withdraw from the bout due to medical resons and The fight was rescheduled for ONE 157.

Results

Bonus awards
The following fighters received $50,000 bonuses.

 Performance of the Night: Angela Lee, Yoshihiro Akiyama, John Wayne Parr, Hiroki Akimoto, Tang Kai, Sinsamut Klinmee, Kang Ji Won and Danielle Kelly

See also 

 2022 in ONE Championship
 List of ONE Championship events
 List of current ONE fighters

References 

Events in Singapore
ONE Championship events
2022 in mixed martial arts
Mixed martial arts in Singapore
Sports competitions in Singapore
March 2022 sports events in Singapore